Globorotalia menardii is a perforate foraminiferan, about  in size. It is a single-celled animal large enough to be seen with a naked eye and is found in the fossil record back to the Paleocene.

References

Globothalamea
Species described in 1865